Emita is a rural locality on Flinders Island in the local government area of Flinders in the North-east region of Tasmania. The 2016 census determined a population of 68 for the state suburb of Emita.

History
Emita was gazetted as a locality in 1970. The name is an Aboriginal word for “sand”, and has been used by the Aboriginal community since the 1800s. The first European name was Settlement Point, which had been changed to Emita by 1916.

Geography
Bass Strait forms the north-west, west, and south-west boundaries.

Road infrastructure
The B85 route (Palana Road) enters from the south and runs through, via the village, to the north before exiting. Route C801 (Fairhaven Road) starts at an intersection with B85 near the northern boundary and runs east before exiting.

References

Flinders Island
Towns in Tasmania